Sahid Group is an Indonesian conglomerate with the hotel industry as its core business, based in Jakarta. The group was founded in 1953 by Sukamdani Sahid Gitosardjono. Currently the group operates 27 hotels across Indonesia under the Sahid Hotels chain. It also operates a hotel in Bukhara, Uzbekistan.

It also has businesses and holdings in the media (Bisnis Indonesia), healthcare, textiles, real estate, and education industry. Sahid Sudirman Center, a skyscraper in Jakarta, was funded by a joint venture of Sahid Group, Pikko Group, and Tan Kian Konsorsium which is known as KSO Sahid Megatama Karya Gemilang and was finished in 2015.

References

External links
 

Companies based in Jakarta
Hospitality companies of Indonesia
Hotel chains in Indonesia
Hotels established in 2003
Indonesian brands
Conglomerate companies of Indonesia
Real estate companies of Indonesia